Tumbok is a 2011 Filipino horror film starring Cristine Reyes and Carlo Aquino produced by Viva Films.

Plot
A married couple inherits a condo unit, unknown to them the area resides in a negative energy convergence area, which made the inhabitants unlucky.

Cast

 Cristine Reyes as Grace
 Carlo Aquino as Ronnie
 Ryan Eigenmann as Mark
 Ara Mina as Rita
 Jao Mapa as Benjie
 DJ Durano as Ward
 LJ Moreno as Lumen
 Wendy Valdez as Lizet
 Malou de Guzman as Elsie	
 Ana Capri as Idang
 Abby Bautista as Isay
 Dino Imperial as Gio
 Francheska Salcedo as Yumi

Reception
Box Office: 10.53 million

See also
 List of ghost films

References

External links
 
 

2010s Tagalog-language films
2011 films
Philippine horror films
Viva Films films